Pravinchandra Varjivan Gandhi (?–2010) was chairman of Dena Bank and a leading newspaper publisher from India. He was awarded the Padma Bhushan in 2002.

References

Recipients of the Padma Bhushan in trade and industry
Indian bankers
2010 deaths
Indian newspaper publishers (people)
Year of birth missing